Horton, Bradford  may refer to:
Little Horton, Bradford
Great Horton, Bradford
Great Horton railway station, Bradford
Horton Park, Bradford
Horton Park railway station, Bradford